The 2005 ASB Classic was a women's tennis tournament played on outdoor hard courts at the ASB Tennis Centre in Auckland, New Zealand that was part of Tier IV of the 2005 WTA Tour. It was the 20th edition of the tournament and took place from 3 January until 8 January 2005. Unseeded Katarina Srebotnik won the singles title and earned $22,000 first-prize money.

Finals

Singles
 Katarina Srebotnik defeated  Shinobu Asagoe, 5–7, 7–5, 6–4
 It was Srebotnik's  1st singles title of the year and the 3rd of her career.

Doubles
  Shinobu Asagoe /  Katarina Srebotnik defeated  Leanne Baker /  Francesca Lubiani, 6–3, 6–3

Prize money and ranking points

Prize money

* per team

Points distribution

See also
 2005 Heineken Open – men's tournament

References

External links
 ITF tournament edition details
 Tournament draws

2005 WTA Tour
2005
ASB
January 2005 sports events in New Zealand
2005 in New Zealand tennis